Monticello Methodist Church is a historic Methodist church off SC 215 in Monticello, Fairfield County, South Carolina.  It was built in 1861, and is a one-story, front gable-roofed, weatherboarded frame building in the Greek Revival style with a meeting house floor plan. The façade features a portico is supported by octagonal wooden columns on a stepped brick entrance.  Also on the property is the church cemetery.

It was added to the National Register of Historic Places in 1984.

References

Methodist churches in South Carolina
Churches on the National Register of Historic Places in South Carolina
Greek Revival church buildings in South Carolina
Churches completed in 1861
19th-century Methodist church buildings in the United States
Churches in Fairfield County, South Carolina
National Register of Historic Places in Fairfield County, South Carolina
1861 establishments in South Carolina
Wooden churches in South Carolina